Gungahlin is a suburb in the Canberra, Australia district with the same name; Gungahlin. The postcode is 2912.  Gungahlin is the name for the entire district, and also the town centre, but it is also the name of the suburb which Gungahlin Town Centre is in.

It is next to the suburbs of Ngunnawal, Palmerston, Franklin, Harrison, Throsby, Forde and Amaroo. Burgmann Anglican School is located in the suburb. The edges of the suburb are on Horse Park Drive, Gundaroo Drive and Gungahlin Drive.

Gungahlin Town Centre

The commercial heart of the Gungahlin Town Centre is Hibberson St, the centre's main street, though the boundary of commercial activities in Anthony Rolfe Avenue, Gundaroo Drive and Gozzard Street. There are currently four retail anchor stores in the town centre, namely Coles, Woolworths, Aldi and Big W which are located in separate developments in Hibberson Street. There are two licensed clubs in the Town Centre: the Raiders Club located at the intersection of Hibberson and Gozzard Streets; and Eastlake Gungahlin Club located at the intersection of Hinder and Efkarpidis Streets. The Gungahlin Public Library officially opened in June 2011, and adjoining senior high school opened later that year. Burgmann College is located in the suburb of Gungahlin.

Gungahlin Town Centre is one endpoint of stage 1 of Canberra's Light Rail network. Stage 1 runs from Gungahlin Town Centre to Civic.

Demographics
The next most common countries of birth were China (8.7%), India (7.5%), Nepal (4.9%), South Korea (3.0%) and Vietnam (1.9%). 48.5% of people spoke only English at home. Other languages spoken at home included Mandarin (9.8%), Nepali (4.7%), Korean (3.2%) and Vietnamese (2.2%). The most common responses for religion were No Religion (39.5%) and Catholic (14.4%). 35.5% of dwellings were separate houses, 17.4% were semi-detached, row or terrace houses or townhouses and 46.5% of were flats or apartments.

Geology

The Gungahlin suburb is underlain by the middle Silurian age Canberra Formation.  Most of this is slaty shale and mudstone.  But there are also a couple of bands of ashstone in the south and north west.  The structure of the rock has been folded by anticlines and a syncline with a north east direction.  The Gungahlin Fault is parallel to the folds and passes through the east of the town center.  To the south it passes through Crace, Kaleen, Bruce and Aranda where it stops at the Deakin Fault.  The Gungahlin Fault is also parallel to the Winslade Fault and is no doubt connected with it.  In the north east direction it 
passes out of the ACT northern end and ends near the Sullivans Fault.

Footnotes

Suburbs of Canberra